Turrilatirus turritus is a species of sea snail, a marine gastropod mollusk in the family Fasciolariidae, the spindle snails, the tulip snails and their allies.

Description
The length of the shell attains 65 mm.

Distribution
This marine species has a wide distribution: the Red Sea, Mozambique, South Africa, the Mascarenes, the Philippines, Indonesia, Sri Lanka, Japan, Australia, New Caledonia, Papua New Guinea, the Solomon Islands.

References

 Marais J.P. & R.N. Kilburn (2010) Fasciolariidae. pp. 106–137, in: Marais A.P. & Seccombe A.D. (eds), Identification guide to the seashells of South Africa. Volume 1. Groenkloof: Centre for Molluscan Studies. 376 pp

External links
 Gmelin, J. F. (1791). Vermes. In: Gmelin J.F. (Ed.) Caroli a Linnaei Systema Naturae per Regna Tria Naturae, Ed. 13. Tome 1(6). G.E. Beer, Lipsiae
 Deshayes, G. P. (1833). (Coquilles de la Mer Rouge) in L. de Laborde, Voyage de l'Arabie Pétrée par Léon de Laborde et Linant. Giard, Paris. 87 pp, 69 pl., 2 maps.

Fasciolariidae
Gastropods described in 1791